Capital (Capital in Romanian) is a Romanian financial and economic weekly magazine published in Bucharest.

Capital offers analyses, investigations and trend predictions accompanied by graphics, tables and photos to all with an interest in economics. Capital offers its readers guidance in their entrepreneurial initiatives, going beyond the news in order to discover the causes that generate the events.

Capital was the first publication launched by Ringier in Romania. It was started in 1990. Capital was re-launched in 2000 and 2004 in a new and modern graphic concept. Capital has launched the Top 300 Richest Romanians. Other two tops were added in the following years: Top 100 Successful Women and in 2005 Top 100 Companies to Work for.

Regular sections:
 Actuality;
 Business;
 Investments;
 Consultancy;

Editorial Supplements:

Capital issues the following supplements:
 Gadget
 European Funds
 Banking
 Buildings&Real Estate
 Foreign Investments
 Financial services

Brand extensions:
The magazine publishes in Romania the Top Capital Collection:
 Top 300 Richest Romanian People
 Top 100 Most Successful Women
 Top 100 Companies to Work for
 Top 120 Best Franchises in Romania

TV Shows:
 Capital TV on Kanal D.

Capital TV sections:
 Behind the economy curtains
 Capital expert
 People on top
 Trends

See also
 List of magazines in Romania

References

External links
 Official website

1990 establishments in Romania
Business magazines
Magazines established in 1990
Magazines published in Bucharest
Weekly magazines published in Romania
Romanian-language magazines